Zhanazhol Field (Jańajol munaı-gaz kondensat ken orny) is an oil field located in the northwestern region of the Republic of Kazakhstan.  It was discovered in the 1960 and have been in production since 1987.  Zhanazhol crude oil has a high mercaptan and hydrogen sulfide content.

External links

Kazakhstan's Gas: Export Markets and Export Routes, by Shamil Midkhatovich Yenikeyeff, Oxford Institute for Energy Studies, November 2008 
Lukoil - International Exploration

Oil fields of Kazakhstan
Oil fields of the Soviet Union